The Miller Center is a nonpartisan affiliate of the University of Virginia that specializes in United States presidential scholarship, public policy, and political history.

History 
The Miller Center was founded in 1975 through the philanthropy of Burkett Miller, a 1914 graduate of the University of Virginia School of Law and prominent Tennessean, in honor of his father, White Burkett Miller. Troubled by the partisan rancor he saw developing throughout the nation, Miller envisioned a place where leaders, scholars, and the public could come together for discussion grounded in history in order to find solutions. Through Miller's lead gift, as well as through past and present gifts by the center's supporters, the Miller Center's combined endowment now stands at more than $70 million. The center, under the oversight of its Governing Council, is an integral part of the University of Virginia, with maximum autonomy within the university system. Its programs are supported fully by funds it solicits (through the Miller Center Foundation) and its endowment.

Programs 
The Presidential Oral History Program interviews the principal figures in presidential administrations to create a historical record in the words of those who knew each administration best. The oral histories of Jimmy Carter, Ronald Reagan, George H. W. Bush, Bill Clinton, Edward Kennedy, and George W. Bush have been released. Barack Obama and Hillary Clinton are in progress.

The Presidential Recordings Program researches, transcribes, and annotates the thousands of hours of secret White House tapes recorded by U.S. presidents, from Franklin Roosevelt to Richard Nixon, plus Ronald Reagan.

The National Fellowship Program funds and supports PhD candidates who are studying the historical roots of today's policy issues. The program pairs fellows with leading scholars in their field, and teaches them how to make their scholarship more accessible to the public.

Academic Programs conduct scholarly study of modern political and presidential history, and convene conferences and symposia on the historical roots of contemporary policy issues.

Policy Programs bring together scholars, policymakers, and stakeholders to develop insights – grounded in scholarship and based on the lessons of history – to illuminate and offer solutions to the nation's policy challenges.

American President: An Online Reference Resource provides in-depth information on every presidential administration, including essays on all aspects of that administration that have been written or reviewed by presidential scholars.

Leadership 
William J. Antholis is director and CEO of the Miller Center.

Previous directors include Gerald Baliles—the 65th governor of Virginia—for eight years (2006–14). Dr. Phillip Zelikow was director from 1999-2005 and is currently White Burkett Miller Professor History at the University of Virginia and previously the executive director of the 9/11 Commission, in addition to numerous posts in many levels of government service. Dr. Kenneth W. Thompson, who had previously served as the vice president for International Programs at the Rockefeller Foundation, led the Miller Center from 1978 to 1998. He created and expanded the center's Forum program (which he ran until 2004), its Presidential Oral History Program (with James Young), and the Miller Center Bipartisan National Commissions. The center's longest serving director, Professor Thompson was also the J. Wilson Professor of Government and Foreign Affairs at the University of Virginia and the author of many books on international affairs published by LSU Press and the Miller Center.
 The founding Director of the Miller Center was Frederick Nolting and the first Director of the Presidency Program was the distinguished political scientist, Herbert J. Storing.

University of Virginia office 
The core of the Miller Center's facilities is the historic Faulkner House, built in 1856 and named for novelist William Faulkner, the university's writer-in-residence in 1957. Faulkner House was the home of United States senator Thomas S. Martin, who represented Virginia in the U.S. Senate from 1895 to 1919 and served as majority leader. In 1989, the center added the Newman Pavilion, which houses the Forum Room, and in 2003, it built the Thompson Pavilion and Scripps Library. The additions are prominent examples of new traditional architecture.

References

External links
 

University of Virginia
Nonpartisan organizations in the United States
1975 establishments in Virginia
Political and economic think tanks in the United States
Foreign policy and strategy think tanks in the United States
Non-profit organizations based in Virginia